Task Force on Rehabilitation of India-returnee Refugees and Internally Displaced Persons is a Bangladesh government task force established to rehabilitate refugees from the Chittagong Hill Tracts conflict following the signing of the Chittagong Hill Tracts Peace Accord.

History 
In 1993, the Indian government provided a list of Bangladeshi refugees in India.

Task Force on Rehabilitation of India-returnee Refugees and Internally Displaced Persons was established in March 1997 following the signing of the Chittagong Hill Tracts Peace Accord and signing of an agreement between the Government of Bangladesh and tribal leaders. The Indian Government also provided an updated list of Bangladeshi refugees in India.

In late 2009, the taskforce report 12,223 families with 64,612 family members returned to the Chittagong Hill Tracts following the end of the conflict. 

In December 2016; the taskforce identified an additional 21,900 refugee families returning from India.

In September 2018, the taskforce created a list of 21,900 refugee families returning from India and 82,000 internally displaced families. The task force forwarded the list to Ministry of Chittagong Hill Tracts Affairs so that the refugees could be resettled at the expense of the government. The Task force had identified 38,000 non-tribal internally displaced but has placed a proposal for their rehabilitation. 

Former Chairperson of Kamalchhari Union Parishad, criticized the 2018 list for being inaccurate. An anonymous security personnel in Chittagong Hill Tracts claimed that the list contains citizens of India and Myanmar and the taskforce was colluding with them to destabilize the Chittagong Hill Tracts. Kujendralal Tripura, chairman of the taskforce, described only the 2009 list as being accurate.

On 22 October 2019, the taskforce held its 10th meeting at the Chittagong Circuit House. The meeting was presided over by its chairperson and Member of Parliament, Kujendra Lal Tripura. The taskforce stated that the government has not implemented all the decisions of the taskforce and about 10 thousand refugees were not rehabilitated. The taskforce forwards land disputes that returning refugees might have to the Chittagong Hill Tracts Land Dispute Resolution Commission.  Many of the return refugees have not been adequately rehabilitated and lack proper housing.

References 

1997 establishments in Bangladesh
Organisations based in Dhaka
Government agencies of Bangladesh